Bjørn Erik Hollevik (born 10 October 1956) is a Norwegian politician for the Conservative Party.

He served as a deputy representative to the Parliament of Norway from Sogn og Fjordane during the term 2013–2017. He hails from Flora and has been a member of the county council.

References

1956 births
Living people
People from Flora, Norway
Deputy members of the Storting
Conservative Party (Norway) politicians
Sogn og Fjordane politicians